Lee Woo-seok (born 7 August 1997) is a South Korean archer who competed at the 2014 Summer Youth Olympics. He won the gold medal in the men's event.

Lee lives in Seoul and attends Suncheon high school. He says that his coach Kim Min-hyun is his hero and that his ambition is to be an Olympic champion.

References

Living people
1997 births
South Korean male archers
Archers at the 2014 Summer Youth Olympics
Universiade medalists in archery
Asian Games medalists in archery
Archers at the 2018 Asian Games
Asian Games silver medalists for South Korea
Medalists at the 2018 Asian Games
Universiade gold medalists for South Korea
Youth Olympic gold medalists for South Korea
Medalists at the 2017 Summer Universiade
Medalists at the 2019 Summer Universiade
21st-century South Korean people